Austin ReBlend is a paint recycling program administered by the City of Austin in Austin, Texas. In 2012, Austin ReBlend produced  of wholly recycled paint.

History
In 2009, Austin ReBlend received a grant to purchase equipment that allowed it to process and manufacture paint on-site, as opposed to through an independent contractor, which raised its production efficiency substantially.

Production

The service aggregates locally recycled latex paint, processes and analyzes it for quality control, and then retrofits candidate material into a new 100% post-consumer, low-volatile organic compound product. In order to optimize manufacturing efficiency and to provide a stable consumer product, Austin ReBlend produces two pliable shades of beige: Texas Limestone and Balcones Canyonland, as well as a shade of green: Barton Creek Greenbelt. According to annual reports, the service produced 8,333 gallons of recycled paint during 2011. It is also experimenting and researching new ways to improve its process.

Distribution
Austin ReBlend operates out of the Household Hazardous Waste Facility in Southeast Austin.

Availability
The service's recycled paint is made available free of charge to individuals and nonprofit civic organizations. A blacklist is also maintained to deter excessive exploitation of the service.

References

External links
Official site
Austin Recycles on Facebook

Culture of Austin, Texas
Economy of Austin, Texas
Government of Austin, Texas
Government programs
Paint recycling
Recycling in the United States